Mia foni is the debut album of Greek American singer Annet Artani. Released in early April 2006, it features 19 tracks in both Greek and English, including "Why Angels Cry", the song that Artani performed in the Eurovision Song Contest 2006 in Athens, representing Cyprus.  The album was released in both Greece and Cyprus, where it entered the top 10.

Track listing

Release history

Charts

References

Annet Artani albums
2006 debut albums
Virus Music albums